Xavier Vallmajó Tercero (Born 19 February 1975 in Barcelona, Spain) is a Spanish former professional basketball player. He played the point guard position.

Player career 
1992/97  Adepaf Figueres
1997/03  (Casademont) Girona
2003/05  (Farho) Gijón
2005/06  Palma Aqua Mágica
2006/07  (Plus Pujol) Lleida
2007/08  Melilla
2008/09  CB Villa de Los Barrios

Personal life
Xavi's younger brother is basketball player Jordi Vallmajó Tercero.

References

External links
Profile at ACB.com
Profile at FEB.es
Profile at Eurobasket.com
Liga ACB statistics at Basketball Reference

1975 births
Living people
Melilla Baloncesto players
Spanish men's basketball players
Gijón Baloncesto players
Liga ACB players
CB Girona players